Gimonäs is a residential area in Umeå, Sweden.

External links
Gimonäs at Umeå Municipality

Umeå